American Hardcore: The History of American Punk Rock 1980–1986 is a documentary directed and produced by Paul Rachman and written by Steven Blush.
It is based on the 2001 book American Hardcore: A Tribal History also written by Blush.  It world premiered at the 2006 Sundance Film Festival and was released on September 22, 2006 on a limited basis by Sony Pictures Classics. The film features some early pioneers of the hardcore punk music scene including Bad Brains, Black Flag, D.O.A., Minor Threat, Minutemen, SSD, and others. It was released on DVD by Sony Pictures Home Entertainment on February 20, 2007.

Synopsis
The film addresses the birth and evolution of hardcore punk rock from 1978 to 1986 (although the packaging says 1980-1986). The documentary boasts extensive underground footage shot during the height of the hardcore movement.  It features exclusive interviews with early hardcore punk music artists from bands such as Black Flag, Minor Threat, Bad Brains, and many more.

Production
The film was shot and edited for 5 years with many clips of 80s hardcore bands being sent in by the bands themselves. Some of the footage was shot by director Paul Rachman in the 80s with the most notable piece of footage being the final show of Negative FX which spawned a riot after the power was cut mid-song.

Many of the interviews were actually done in both Paul Rachman's and Steven Blush's apartments in different areas to make it seem like they were done in different locations.

The film also features the photography of Edward Colver notably and principally, and his shot of Danny Spira from Wasted Youth covered in blood was used for the book cover.

Soundtrack

Track listing
   Nervous Breakdown – Black Flag
    Out of Vogue – Middle Class
    Pay To Cum – Bad Brains
     Fucked Up Ronnie – D.O.A.
    Red Tape – Circle Jerks
  Filler – Minor Threat
  I Remember – MDC
   Nic Fit – Untouchables
  Kill a Commie – Gang Green
  Boston Not L.A. – The Freeze
   Straight Jacket – Jerry's Kids
   Boiling Point – SSD
   Who Are You/Time To Die – Void
  Came Without Warning – Scream
  Enemy for Life – YDI
  Runnin' Around – D.R.I.
   Don't Tread On Me – Cro-Mags
   Friend or Foe – Negative Approach
   Bad Attitude – Articles of Faith
  Think For Me – Die Kreuzen
   I Hate Sports – 7 Seconds
  Brickwall – Big Boys
   I Was a Teenage Fuckup – Really Red
   I Hate Children – The Adolescents
  My Mind's Diseased – Battalion of Saints
  Ha Ha Ha – Flipper
  Victim In Pain – Agnostic Front

Interviewees
Jonathan Anastas formerly of D.Y.S. and Slapshot
Phil Anselmo formerly of Pantera and Superjoint Ritual
Brian Baker of Bad Religion, formerly of Minor Threat and Dag Nasty
Dicky Barrett of Mighty Mighty Bosstones, formerly of Impact Unit and The Cheapskates
Vic Bondi formerly of Articles of Faith
Dave Brockie of Death Piggy (which would later form into the band GWAR), formerly of X-Cops, and the Dave Brockie Experience
Curtis Casella, owner and founder of Taang! Records
Brandon Cruz of Dr. Know (band), formerly of the Dead Kennedys
Bob Cenci of Gang Green and Jerry's Kids
Steve "Mugger" Corbin, former Black Flag roadie and formerly of Nig-Heist
Mike Dean of Corrosion of Conformity
Dave Dictor of MDC
Chris Doherty of Gang Green, formerly of Jerry's Kids
Harley Flanagan founding member of the Cro-Mags
Flea of the Red Hot Chili Peppers, formerly of Fear
Flipper members Bruce Loose, Ted Falconi and Steve DePace
Greg Ginn formerly of Black Flag
Jack Grisham of T.S.O.L.
Brett Gurewitz of Bad Religion, owner of punk rock record label Epitaph Records
H.R., Dr. Know and Darryl Jenifer of Bad Brains
Greg Hetson of Bad Religion and the Circle Jerks
John Joseph of the Cro-Mags
Joe Keithley of D.O.A.
Alec Mackaye formerly of The Faith
Ian Mackaye of Fugazi, formerly of The Teen Idles and Minor Threat
Paul Mahern of Zero Boys
Moby formerly of the Vatican Commandos and, briefly, Flipper
Keith Morris of the Circle Jerks, formerly of Black Flag
Duff McKagan, formerly of The Fartz and Guns N' Roses
Reed Mullin of Corrosion of Conformity
Rev. Hank Peirce former roadie for Slapshot, Corrosion of Conformity and Uniform Choice
Kira Roessler formerly of Black Flag
Henry Rollins of Rollins Band, formerly of Black Flag and State of Alert
Kevin Seconds of 7 Seconds
Dave Smalley of Down by Law, formerly of D.Y.S., ALL, and Dag Nasty
Bobby Steele of The Undead and The Misfits
Dave "Springa" Spring formerly of SS Decontrol
Vinnie Stigma of Agnostic Front
Mike Watt formerly of the Minutemen and Firehose
Perry Webb of Culturcide
Todd Youth of The Chelsea Smiles, formerly of Agnostic Front, Warzone and Murphy's Law
Mike Patton of Middle Class, Elysian Fields, Trotsky Icepick and Jeff Atta of Middle Class

References

Bibliography
 Blush, Steven (2001). American Hardcore: A Tribal History. Second ed., 2010. Feral House. .

External links
 
An Interview with director Paul Rachman
American Hardcore Reviews at Metacritic.com

American Hardcore soundtrack
Featured rock photographer Edward Colver's website

2006 films
Documentary films about punk music and musicians
Films based on non-fiction books
Punk films
Sony Pictures Classics films
Films set in the 1980s
2000s English-language films